CGN's Xitieshan Solar Park is a 100 megawatt (MW) photovoltaic power station located in the Qinghai Province, China. Construction was completed in three phases, Xitieshan Phase I was 10 MW, Xitieshan Phase II was 30 MW, and Xitieshan Phase III was 60 MW. It was completed on 30 September 2011, and at the time was the largest grid connected photovoltaic power station in the world.

See also

 Solar power in China
 Golmud Solar Park
 Photovoltaic power station
 List of photovoltaic power stations

References

External links
 CGN Solar Energy

Photovoltaic power stations in China
Buildings and structures in Qinghai